The Laforey class (redesignated in October 1913 as the L class) was a class of 22 torpedo boat destroyers of the Royal Navy, twenty of which were built under the Naval Programme of 1912–13 and a further two under the 2nd War Emergency Programme of 1914. As such they were the penultimate pre-war British destroyer design (the M class built under the Naval Programme of 1913–14 being the last design). All served during World War I during which three were lost; the survivors were all scrapped in 1921-23.

Naming system
As was previous Royal Navy practice, the first 20 ships were originally allocated names with no particular systematic theme, although the majority were given names taken from Shakespearean or (Sir Walter) Scott characters. However, whilst still building in 1913 they were redesignated as the 'L' class and these original names were replaced on 30 September 1913 by new names beginning with the class letter 'L', the first ships to follow this new convention (see naming conventions for destroyers of the Royal Navy). The last pair - Lochinvar and Lassoo - were renamed in February 1915.

Alexander Fullerton included a fictional Laforey class destroyer, called the Lanyard, in his book "The blooding of the Guns", set during the battle of Jutland.

Design
The Laforeys were based on the modified   that trialled a new hull form that was slightly longer and narrower than that of the Acastas and incorporated a clipper bow. Except for the ships built by J. Samuel White (Laurel and Liberty) and by Yarrow (Lark, Landrail, Laverock and Linnet), which had two funnels, all the other ships had three funnels of equal height, the middle being thicker than the fore and aft.

Armament was increased over the Acastas, with the number of torpedo tubes doubled to two pairs - abaft the funnels - with a small searchlight platform in between. The gun armament remained as three QF 4-inch, but was more usefully distributed; with one gun each on the forecastle, between the funnels (the after pair in ships with three) and on the quarterdeck.

Propulsion
Laforey and Leonidas were fitted with geared (as opposed to direct drive) steam turbines for increased efficiency. Llewellyn, Lennox, Lochinvar and Lassoo were the first destroyers built for the Royal Navy at William Beardmore's new naval construction yard at Dalmuir.

Minelayer
Legion was later fitted for minelaying, for which purposes her quarterdeck gun and torpedo tubes were removed and screens were erected aft of the after funnel to provide protection for mines. The screens were painted with dummy torpedo tubes and a gun so as not to identify her as a minelayer.

Service
At the outbreak of World War I the Laforeys formed the 3rd Destroyer Flotilla. Lance is credited as having fired the first shot of the naval war when, in company with the flotilla leader , she sank the German auxiliary minelayer  the day after war was declared, on 5 August 1914 in the North Sea. The particular gun concerned is preserved at the Imperial War Museum in London.

Two months later on 17 October 1914, off the Dutch island of Texel, Lance, Legion, Lennox and Loyal engaged German torpedo boats and sank , S117, S118 and  during the Battle off Texel. Lydiard (acting as flotilla leader), with Landrail, Laurel and Liberty were present at the Battle of Jutland on 31 May / 1 June 1916 as part of the 9th and 10th Destroyer Flotillas.

Ships

Notes

Bibliography

External links

Destroyer classes